Hector Ross (1914-1980) was a British stage, film and television actor.

Partial filmography
 Night Beat (1947) - Don Brady
 Bonnie Prince Charlie (1948) - Glenaladale
 The Man Who Disappeared (1951) - Dr. Watson
 Happy Go Lovely (1951) - Harold
 I'm a Stranger (1952) - Inspector Craddock
 Deadly Nightshade (1953) - Canning
 The Steel Key (1953) - Beroni
 Ben-Hur (1959) - Officer (uncredited)
 The Fur Collar (1962) - Roger Harding
 Stranglehold (1962)
 Delayed Flight (1964) - Styles
 Ring of Spies (1964) - Supt. Woods

Television roles
 Father Brown (1974) - Doctor
 Murder Most English (1977) - Marcus Gwill

References

External links
 

1914 births
1980 deaths
British male stage actors
British male film actors
British male television actors
People from Ross and Cromarty
20th-century British male actors